This is a list of alleged sightings of UFOs in India:

Pre-historic era 
 Pre-historic rock cave paintings related to Hinduism found at Charama, Kanker Chhattisgarh state depict human figures wearing suits similar to modern day space suits and drawings similar to flying saucers, each with a fan-like antenna and three legs.

1951 
 On 15 March, 10:21 a.m. in New Delhi, members of a flying club saw a cigar-shaped object in the sky which was about one hundred feet long. The UFO hovered for some time and then vanished from the sight.

2004 

 On September 24, a team of scientists in Samudra Tapu spotted a white object resembling a "snow man" on top of an adjacent mountain ridge at around 6:45 a.m. India Today speculated the UFO could be "a spy drone from across the border" or "a spy balloon".|

2007 
 On October 29, a fast moving object was spotted at 30° in the eastern horizon at Eastern Kolkata between 3:30 and 6:30 am and was filmed using a video camera. Its shape shifted from a sphere to a triangle and then to a straight line. The object emitted a bright light forming a halo and radiated a range of colours. It was spotted by locals and hundreds gathered along the E.M. Bypass to catch a glimpse of the UFO, triggering a frenzy. The video footage was released on a TV News channel and later shown to Dr. D P Duari, the director of MP Birla Planetarium, Kolkata, who found it to be "extremely interesting and strange". Duari later identified the object as be the planet Venus.

2013 
 Residents of Mogappiar, Chennai observed five specks of bright orange light moving from south to north around 8.55 pm on 20 June and was later reported on the local newspaper on 23 June.
 On 4 August, soldiers of Indian Army observed unidentified flying objects over Lagan Kher Area, Demchock, Ladakh. It was also reported that army troops had observed more than a hundred different incidents of UFO movements in the border areas of Arunachal Pradesh in the preceding seven months.

2014
 A series of pictures of the sunset over the Rajajipuram area of Lucknow on 23 July claimed to show a UFO.
 A commercial pilot reportedly informed Mumbai Air Traffic Control room that she spotted a black and blueish UFO near Pune during the first week of October at a height of about 26,300 feet. 
 A photograph published by the news media claimed to show a "nail shaped" UFO over Kochi in the southern Indian state of Kerala on 29 October.

2015 

In Gorakhpur, Uttar Pradesh, a local resident claimed to have taken a photo of a large UFO. However, a rash of similar photos from other parts of the world depicting the appearance of a UFO similar to the one in the movie Independence Day were most likely "created using digital editing software or even a mobile phone app, as some on the market allow UFOs to be blended into pictures".
In June, a boy from Kanpur, Uttar Pradesh reportedly captured a flying saucer in his father's phone while clicking photos of clouds.

2021 

In January, some local residents from Ludhiana, Punjab claimed that they saw an unidentified flying object (UFO) in the sky. A similar incident occurred in December also.

References

External links 
 MUFON - Last 20 UFO Sightings and Pictures

India
Historical events in India